Zickhusen is a municipality in the Nordwestmecklenburg district, in Mecklenburg-Vorpommern, Germany.

The small lake Schwarzer See is located in the municipality.

References

Nordwestmecklenburg